Statistics of Scottish Football League in season 1970/1971.

Scottish League Division One

Aberdeen, with 15 straight wins of which the last 12 were without conceding, led the league from December until the last week of the season. Aberdeen faced Celtic in their penultimate game needing a win to almost certainly clinch the title, but could only draw 1-1: and then they lost their last game, at Falkirk, allowing Celtic
to take the championship by 2 points.

Scottish League Division Two

See also
1970–71 in Scottish football

References

 
Scottish Football League seasons